"There You Go" is a song recorded by American country music group Exile.  It was released in December 1990 as the fourth single from the album Still Standing.  The song reached #32 on the Billboard Hot Country Singles & Tracks chart.  The song was written by Randy Sharp and Donny Lowery.

Chart performance

References

1990 singles
1990 songs
Exile (American band) songs
Songs written by Randy Sharp
Songs written by Donny Lowery
Arista Records singles